Herencia is a posthumous compilation album by Colombian-American singer-songwriter Soraya. It was released in 2006 by Universal Music.

Track listing
 "De Repente"
 "Quédate"
 "En Esta Noche"
 "Amor En Tus Ojos"
 "Avalancha"
 "Pueblito Viejo"
 "Lejos de Aquí"
 "París, Calí, Milán"
 "Torre De Marfil"
 "Cuerpo Y Alma"
 "¿En Dónde Estás?"
 "Half"
 "When Did I Say That?"
 "You and I"
 "Dance of the Waiting"
 "Tu Y Yo" (Soul Solution Remix)
 "¿En Dónde Estas?" (Hardball Tropical Mix)

References

2006 greatest hits albums
Universal Records albums
Soraya (musician) albums
albums produced by Rod Argent